(February 11, 1942-December 17, 2009

References

Supreme Court of Japan justices
1942 births
2009 deaths